The 1956–57 Georgetown Hoyas men's basketball team represented Georgetown University during the 1956–57 NCAA University Division college basketball season. Tom Nolan coached them in his first season as head coach. The team was an independent and played its home games at McDonough Gymnasium on the Georgetown campus in Washington, D.C. It finished with a record of 11-11 – the best of Nolan's four-year tenure as head coach – and had no post-season play.

Georgetown's new head coach, Tom Nolan, had been a standout on the Georgetown basketball teams of the 1935-36, 1936-37, and 1937-38 seasons and would coach the Hoyas for four seasons. His assistant, who also joined the Hoyas this season, was Tommy O'Keefe, a star Georgetown player of the 1946-47, 1947-48, 1948-49, and 1949-50 seasons who had then played for a season in the National Basketball Association (NBA). In 1960, O'Keefe would succeed Nolan as Georgetown's head coach.

Season recap

Senior forward Warren Buehler, who had taken a leave of absence from the team the previous season, returned this season and played in 20 games, scoring 228 points despite a slow start, with 20 or more points three times in games late in the season. He graduated after the end of the season as the top scorer and second all-time rebounder in Georgetown history at the time, with 1,134 career points and 461 career rebounds.

Senior forward Joe Missett also played in 20 games and scored in double figures in each of them, averaging 15.9 points per game. He was the team's top scorer for the second straight year and became the first Georgetown player in history to lead the team in rebounds in three consecutive seasons.

Senior guard-forward Matt White scored in double figures in all but five games, and over a nine-game stretch scored exactly 16 points six times. Junior forward Ken Pichette averaged 11.0 points per game.

The team finished with a record of 11-11, had no postseason play, and was not ranked in the Top 20 in the Associated Press Poll or Coaches' Poll at any time.

Roster
Sources

1956–57 schedule and results

Sources

Notes

|-
!colspan=9 style="background:#002147; color:#8D817B;"| Regular Season

Notes

References

Georgetown Hoyas men's basketball seasons
Georgetown
Georgetown Hoyas men's basketball team
Georgetown Hoyas men's basketball team